A by-election was held for the New South Wales Legislative Assembly electorate of Bulli on 9 July 1955 because of the death of Laurie Kelly.

Dates

Result

Laurie Kelly died. Preferences were not distributed.

See also
Electoral results for the district of Bulli
List of New South Wales state by-elections

References

New South Wales state by-elections
1955 elections in Australia
1950s in New South Wales